William Babcock (1785October 20, 1838) was an American politician and a U.S. representative from New York's twenty-sixth district.

Biography
Born in Hinsdale, New Hampshire, Babcock attended the common schools.

Career
Babcock moved to Penn Yan, New York, in 1813 and engaged in mercantile pursuits owning more that one store.  Upon the formation of Yates County he was appointed by the Governor as the first county treasurer in 1823.

Elected as an Anti-Masonic candidate to the Twenty-second Congress, Babcock served as a U.S. Representative for the twenty-sixth district of New York from March 4, 1831 to March 3, 1833. Resuming his mercantile pursuits, he was also engaged as a hotel keeper.

Death
Babcock died in Penn Yan, Yates County, New York, on October 20, 1838 (age about 53 years). He is interred at City Hill Cemetery, near Penn Yan, New York.

References

External links

1785 births
1838 deaths
People from Hinsdale, New Hampshire
Anti-Masonic Party members of the United States House of Representatives from New York (state)
People from Penn Yan, New York
19th-century American politicians